This was the first edition of the tournament.

Luke Bambridge and Neal Skupski won the title after defeating Leander Paes and Miguel Ángel Reyes-Varela 6–3, 6–4 in the final.

Seeds

Draw

External Links
 Main Draw

Oracle Challenger Series - Chicago - Men's Doubles
2018 Men's Doubles